Giuseppe Mortarotti (born in 1903 in Valduggia, Piedmont) was an Italian professional football player.

1903 births
Year of death missing
People from Valduggia
Italian footballers
Serie A players
Juventus F.C. players
Atalanta B.C. players
Cosenza Calcio 1914 players
Association football defenders
Footballers from Piedmont
Sportspeople from the Province of Vercelli